The Return of Rusty is a 1946 American drama film directed by William Castle and starring Ted Donaldson, John Litel and Mark Dennis. It was the second in the eight part Rusty film series produced by Columbia Pictures.

Cast
 Ted Donaldson as Danny Mitchell 
 John Litel as Hugh Mitchell 
 Mark Dennis as Loddy Bicek 
 Barbara Wooddell as Mrs. Mitchell 
 Robert Kellard as Sgt. Jack Beals 
 Mickey Kuhn as Marty Connors 
 Teddy Infuhr as Herbie 
 Dwayne Hickman as Bobby 
 Mickey McGuire as Porky 
 Gene Collins as Motor policeman 
 David Ackles as Peanuts 
 Donald Davis as Trailer boy 
 Pat O'Malley as Immigration Officer

References

Bibliography
 Blottner, Gene. Columbia Pictures Movie Series, 1926-1955: The Harry Cohn Years. McFarland, 2011.

External links
 

1946 films
1946 drama films
American drama films
Films directed by William Castle
Columbia Pictures films
American black-and-white films
Rusty (film series)
1940s English-language films
1940s American films